The men's 200 metre backstroke event at the 1980 Summer Olympics was held on 26 July at the Swimming Pool at the Olimpiysky Sports Complex. There were 25 competitors from 16 nations, with each nation having up to three swimmers. The event was won by Sándor Wladár of Hungary, with his countryman Zoltán Verrasztó taking second. Mark Kerry of Australia earned bronze. They were the first medals in the event for both nations. The United States' four-Games podium streak (over which the nation earned 10 of 12 possible medals) ended due to the American-led boycott.

Background

This was the sixth appearance of the 200 metre backstroke event. It was first held in 1900. The event did not return until 1964; since then, it has been on the programme at every Summer Games. From 1904 to 1960, a men's 100 metre backstroke was held instead. In 1964, only the 200 metres was held. Beginning in 1968 and ever since, both the 100 and 200 metre versions have been held.

Five of the 8 finalists from the 1976 Games (all but the medalists) returned: fourth-place finisher Mark Tonelli and fifth-place finisher Mark Kerry of Australia, sixth-place finisher Miloslav Roľko of Czechoslovakia, and seventh-place finisher Róbert Rudolf and eighth-place finisher Zoltán Verrasztó of Hungary. The medals in 1976 had been swept by American swimmers; the United States boycotted the 1980 Games. Verrasztó had earned medals at each of the three World Championships held so far (silver in 1973, gold in 1975, and bronze in 1978), and was favored with no American swimmers in the pool.

Ireland, Romania, and Vietnam each made their debut in the event. The Netherlands made its sixth appearance, the only nation to have competed at each appearance of the event to that point.

Competition format

The competition used a two-round (heats and final) format. The advancement rule followed the format introduced in 1952. A swimmer's place in the heat was not used to determine advancement; instead, the fastest times from across all heats in a round were used. There were 4 heats of up to 8 swimmers each. The top 8 swimmers advanced to the final. Swim-offs were used as necessary to break ties.

This swimming event used backstroke. Because an Olympic-size swimming pool is 50 metres long, this race consisted of four lengths of the pool.

Records
Prior to this competition, the existing world and Olympic records were as follows.

Schedule

All times are Moscow Time (UTC+3)

Results

Heats

Final

References

B
200 metre backstroke at the Olympics
Men's events at the 1980 Summer Olympics